Piet de Wolf (1921–14 November 2013) was a Dutch football player, trainer and coach, who played as a goalkeeper.

Death
Piet de Wolf died on 14 November 2013, aged 91, in his hometown of Rotterdam. His funeral took place on 22 November.

References

1921 births
2013 deaths
Footballers from Rotterdam
Dutch footballers
Dutch football managers
SC Cambuur managers
Feyenoord managers
AZ Alkmaar managers
Association football goalkeepers
Fortuna Vlaardingen managers
SC Emma managers